The Murdaugh family is prominent in the Lowcountry region of South Carolina. Three generations named Randolph Murdaugh served consecutively as circuit solicitor (the elected   prosecuting attorney) for the state's 14th judicial district between 1920 and 2006; the family's status led locals to call the five-county district "Murdaugh Country".
Randolph Murdaugh Sr. founded the civil litigation firm that is now the Parker Law Group LLP, in 1910, in Hampton, South Carolina, which now specializes in personal injury litigation.

Richard "Alex" Murdaugh and other members of the Murdaugh family have been the subject of investigations involving wrongful death, murder, corruption, fraud, witness intimidation, theft, and drug and alcohol-related charges. In 2019, Alex's son, Paul Murdaugh, and some of his close friends were implicated in a fatal boating accident, with later allegations of special treatment.
In June 2021, Alex Murdaugh shot and killed his wife Maggie and their son Paul on the grounds of "Moselle," the Murdaugh hunting estate. Alex was subsequently charged with their murders. Alex was also accused of embezzlement from his law firm and resigned in September 2021. After being incarcerated since October 2021, Murdaugh's murder trial began in January 2023 and ended in March 2023 with Murdaugh being found guilty of murdering his wife and son and sentenced to two consecutive life sentences in prison without the possibility of parole.

14th District 

From 1920 to 2006, three members of the Murdaugh family served as the 2nd, 3rd, and 4th Circuit solicitors for the five-county area of South Carolina's Lowcountry region within the 14th Judicial district; the Murdaugh's influence in the area led to it being colloquially known as "Murdaugh Country." In South Carolina, the solicitor, analogous to the district attorney in other U.S. jurisdictions, is in charge of prosecuting all criminal cases in the jurisdiction. The 14th circuit district oversees Allendale, Colleton, Hampton, Beaufort, and Jasper counties. It is the only judicial circuit in the state to cover five counties. According to columnist Kathleen Parker, the jurisdiction of the 14th circuit district was known as "Murdaugh Country", where the justice system was regarded as rigged and local attorneys would make a motion to settle a case rather than go to trial there.

The Murdaugh family was one of South Carolina's most prominent legal families for nearly a century and were featured in the cover story for a 1989 issue of Carolina Lawyer magazine. 
Because of the family's decades-long control of the office of solicitor, they wielded enormous judicial and political power for almost a century. After several Murdaugh family members were implicated in a fatal boating accident in 2019, and after two family members were murdered in a double homicide in 2021, the family's influence on the local judicial system was scrutinized.

Family law firm 

The Murdaugh family law firm Peters Murdaugh Parker Eltzroth & Detrick (PMPED), specialized in personal injury litigation. The firm built its success in the early 2000s due to a state law that made it easier for plaintiffs to forum shop. The law permitted South Carolina residents "to file a suit in any county in which an out-of-state company own[ed] property and conduct[ed] business—regardless of where an accident took place." In Hampton County, trial judges generally avoided transferring cases, and plaintiffs' attorneys had a reputation for abusing subpoena power. This legal climate led to the 14th circuit district being named the third worst "judicial hellhole for defendants" by the American Tort Reform Association.
Because of PMPED's success in suing CSX Transportation, the county was known as a "site of pilgrimage" for those with personal injury lawsuits against railroads. PMPED's offices became known locally as "the house that CSX built". Due to the firm's activities, doing business in Hampton County became a legal liability, resulting in the county losing potential employers.

Reforms enacted in 2005 by both the state supreme court and General Assembly changed South Carolina's corporate venue law, ending plaintiffs' ability to easily forum shop in Hampton County. PMPED changed its name to The Parker Law Group in 2022.

Notable members

Randolph Murdaugh Sr. 

Randolph Murdaugh Sr. was born in Varnville in 1887, the youngest son of Josiah Putnam Murdaugh II, a wealthy Lowcountry businessman, and Annie Marvin Murdaugh. His maternal grandfather, Joseph W. Davis, was a cousin of Confederate President Jefferson Davis. Murdaugh attended the US Naval Academy and graduated from the University of South Carolina (USC) law school in 1910. He married Etta Causey Harvey Murdaugh in 1914 and they had two sons together, Randolph “Buster” Murdaugh Jr. and John Glen “Johnny” Murdaugh.

He ran a local daily newspaper, The Hampton County Herald. In 1920 he became solicitor in the 14th judicial circuit. He held the position until 1940, when he was killed in a collision between his car and a freight train. His car "crashed into a Charleston and Western Carolina freight train at a grade crossing about five miles south of Varnville."

John Glen “Johnny” Murdaugh

Randolph Sr.'s youngest son, Johnny Murdaugh (1918-1987), joined the United States Army and served as a paratrooper. He was the highest decorated veteran of World War II from Hampton County, receiving a Silver Star, two Bronze Stars, and two Purple Hearts. After the war he retired to become a farmer.

Randolph "Buster" Murdaugh Jr.

Randolph Murdaugh Sr. was succeeded by his son, Randolph "Buster" Murdaugh Jr., who served from 1940 to 1986. In his forty-six years in office, Buster ran opposed only twice. A few months after the death of his father, Buster sued the railroad, claiming that poor maintenance of the rail crossing had contributed to the accident. Although there was speculation that the crash was no accident, with some believing that MurdaughSr. intentionally stopped his car on the tracks to commit suicide or that the crash was alcohol-related, the railroad settled the lawsuit for an undisclosed sum.

Buster was known for "his love of chewing tobacco, his courtroom prowess and his flair for acting out murders before spellbound juries". According to Professor John Blume of Cornell Law School, he was rebuked several times by the state supreme court for improper closing arguments in death penalty cases and for arguing in a rape case that if the defendant was acquitted he would release other accused rapists. In 1956 he was indicted by a federal grand jury for allegedly warning a bootlegger to move a moonshine still into a neighboring county to avoid the revenuers; he was acquitted. Buster retired in 1986 and died in 1998.

Randolph Murdaugh III 

Buster was succeeded as a solicitor by his son, Randolph Murdaugh III, who took office in 1986. He ran unopposed in every election and held office until retiring in 2006. Randolph III was married to Elizabeth Alexander and had four children including three sons, Randolph IV (called Randy) and Richard Alexander (called Alex, b. May 27, 1968), both of whom entered the family firm; and John Marvin. In 2019 Randolph III was awarded the Order of the Palmetto, South Carolina's highest civilian recognition, by Governor Henry McMaster. He retired in 2006 and died of natural causes June 10, 2021.

Alex Murdaugh
Richard Alexander "Alex" Murdaugh (born May 27, 1968) is an American attorney and convicted murderer from South Carolina.

Alex graduated from University of South Carolina in 1990 and from the University of South Carolina School of Law in 1994. He soon joined the family firm, volunteering part-time in the 14th circuit solicitor's office. Alex married Margaret Kennedy Branstetter (called Maggie) and had two sons, Richard Alexander MurdaughJr. (called Buster) and Paul Terry Murdaugh (called Paul), who was born in 1999.

Maggie Murdaugh
Maggie Murdaugh was an American murder victim from South Carolina who was Alex Murdaugh's wife until her uxoricide.

Paul Murdaugh
Paul Murdaugh (1999-2021) was an American murder victim who was killed by his father, Alex Murdaugh, while he was under criminal indictment for the wrongful death of Mallory Beach.

Murders and legal issues 
There were three charges from the Hampton County Grand Jury and 99 from the State Grand Jury. He is also a defendant in three separate lawsuits. He has been disbarred, has had his assets seized, and is currently incarcerated for two consecutive life sentences for the murder of his wife and son.

Ongoing investigations  and legal actions

Death of Stephen Smith 

On July 8, 2015, Stephen Smith, a 19-year-old nursing student at Orangeburg–Calhoun Technical College, was found dead from blunt force trauma on a rural road in Hampton County and the case ruled a hit and run with no suspects arrested. Smith was openly gay and a high school classmate of Alex Murdaugh's oldest son, Buster. Witnesses interviewed as part of the original investigation repeatedly implicated Buster as having been involved in a relationship with Stephen, but the case went cold. According to The Greenville News, "rumors hinting at a cover-up and the possible involvement of one or more members of the Murdaugh family ... began circulating around the Hampton County area" soon after Smith's death and according to the Beaufort County Island Packet, the case "reeked of insider interference".

In June 2021, South Carolina Law Enforcement Division (SLED) re-opened the investigation into Smith's death, based on evidence found while investigating the deaths of Alex Murdaugh's wife and son, which had also occurred in June 2021, for which Alex was charged with murder.   .

Death of Gloria Satterfield 

On February 2, 2018, the Murdaughs' longtime housekeeper, Gloria Satterfield, suffered a severe head injury when she fell down the front steps at the family's Moselle estate and died on February 26, 2018, of complications, including a stroke. It had been reported as a "trip and fall" accident, but no coroner was notified, no autopsy was performed, and the death certificate, incongruously, said it was by "natural causes." A coroner testified that describing her death on the death certificate as "natural" was improper.

Satterfield's two sons were awarded an insurance settlement for the accidental and/or natural death, but by 2021, they had not received any money. According to multiple indictments, Alex Murdaugh, Chad Westendorf, and attorney Cory Fleming conspired to steal the Satterfields' $4.3-million insurance policy settlement. The scam worked by diverting the insurance payout to Alex's bank account, then not notifying the Satterfields that the insurance settlement had occurred. It involved forgery, Murdaugh's law firm PMPED, and Palmetto State Bank. The Satterfield sons, represented by malpractice attorney Eric Bland, were ultimately able to recover more than $6.5million during subsequent lawsuits.

On September 15, 2021, authorities announced they opened a criminal investigation into Satterfield's 2018 death. In June 2022, authorities received permission to exhume Satterfield's body to continue investigating her death.

Death of Mallory Beach 

In February 2019, Alex's younger son, Paul Murdaugh, was charged with three felonies, following the death of his teenage friend, Mallory Beach, in a boating accident. Paul's blood alcohol content was .286, over three times the legal limit for operating a motor vehicle (though at the time of the accident, Paul was underage and the legal limit did not apply); yet, despite being the driver of the boat that slammed into a bridge, Paul was not given a field sobriety test, was not taken to jail for booking, nor was he ever handcuffed. This led to the speculation that he had received special treatment owing to his family connections. The judge denied a prosecutorial request that he wear an alcohol monitor.

In court documents, Beach's family implicated Alex and Buster in providing alcohol to the then-underage Paul. As of September 2021, SLED was investigating allegations that police may have been pressured not to charge Paul. The family of Connor Cook, another of the teens  aboard the boat during the accident, filed a lawsuit, claiming Alex had encouraged the Cook family to retain a long-time lawyer friend of Alex's, Cory Fleming, in order to orchestrate the protection of Paul.

The Beach wrongful-death case began the unraveling of Alex Murdaugh's criminal enterprise by exposing financial information that led to an inquiry into Murdaugh's alleged financial wrongdoing. In the days before the killing of his wife and son on June 7, 2021, a judge had scheduled a hearing for June 10, 2021, to consider a motion to compel Murdaugh to turn over his financial information. Likewise, his wife Maggie had arranged for a forensic accountant to review the family finances.

Beach wrongful death lawsuit 

The Murdaugh family, including Alex, are defendants in a wrongful death lawsuit filed in March 2019 and scheduled for trial in 2023. The lawsuit accuses the Murdaugh family of enabling Paul Murdaugh's underage drinking. Mallory Beach died in a boating accident involving a boat owned by Alex that Paul was driving while extremely intoxicated.

Assisted suicide fraud 

On September 3, 2021, Alex resigned from PMPED after the firm confronted him over his years of suspected embezzlement. According to The New York Times, the amount involved was "in the millions." From this point forward, "Alex Murdaugh's house of cards began to collapse", and the case became a national sensation making regular mainstream headlines.

On September 4, Alex was allegedly shot in the head while changing a tire on a rural road. He claimed a truck slowed down, shot him, and drove away. The injury was superficial, and he was released from the hospital soon after.

On September 6, Alex released a statement saying he was entering a rehabilitation facility in Orlando, Florida, for substance abuse treatment.

On September 14, SLED announced that Alex's former client and distant cousin, Curtis Edward Smith  who had also been Alex's source for an oxycodone addiction  had been arrested for having conspired with Alex to kill him in the roadside shooting so that his remaining son Buster would receive a $10million life insurance payout. Smith was charged with assisted suicide, aggravated assault and battery, and insurance fraud. Alex, suffering from "massive depression" and wanting to kill himself, admitted to concocting assisted suicide as a murder scheme. Alex was motivated by a mistaken belief that his son Buster would not receive the insurance money if Alex committed suicide himself.

On November 4, 2021, the Hampton County Grand Jury issued three charges against Murdaugh for a murder-for-hire suicide scheme to gain $10million in insurance money, related to the events that occurred on September 4, 2021, in which Alex was allegedly shot in the head while changing a tire on a rural road. Murdaugh's accomplice in the scheme and the alleged gunman, Curtis Edward Smith, who is also his cousin, has five charges.

Embezzlement allegations 

Attorney Justin Bamberg represents eight people from whom he says Alex Murdaugh stole money while serving as their lawyer. He later said the total number of Murdaugh victims might be between 30 and 50, and the total amount stolen could be as high as $20 million. According to the Island Packet, it is unclear where the money went.

The first case involved Gloria Satterfield, Alex Murdaugh's housekeeper, who died in a fall on his property in 2018. Satterfield's two sons were awarded a settlement of about $3.4 million, but by 2021 they had received nothing. Alex Murdaugh was charged with two felonies related to the missing money.

Hakeem Pinckney was a deaf African-American man involved in a 2009 traffic accident that required permanent life support. Murdaugh personally represented the Pinckney family in a lawsuit against the manufacturer of the tires on the vehicle; the family was awarded a settlement. In 2011, Pinckney died at a care facility after his ventilator was, according to a Pinckney lawyer, "mysteriously unplugged". Murdaugh's law firm handled a wrongful death lawsuit against the care facility. Murdaugh allegedly introduced Pinckney's family to Russell Laffitte, the CEO of Palmetto State Bank, to manage the Pinckney finances due to the size of the settlements. The Pinckneys received some money, but an estimated $800,000 to $1million went missing. In January 2022, the board of Palmetto State Bank fired Laffitte after allegations came to light he was involved with Murdaugh to defraud Pinckney. The board is composed mostly of the Laffitte family, who founded the bank in 1907.

Blondell Gray was killed in an ambulance crash in 2012. According to Bamberg, Gray's family is owed more than $112,000, and the money was stolen by Murdaugh.

Sandra Taylor was a Beaufort woman killed by a drunk driver in Colleton County in 2019. Indictments show Murdaugh reportedly told Taylor's mother she would only receive  $30,000 as a settlement when that figure was over $180,000.

Embezzlement and fraud charges 

On November 19, 2021, the State Grand Jury issued five indictments against Alex Murdaugh on 27 charges of embezzlement and other crimes, including breach of trust, fraudulent intent, money laundering, computer crimes, and forgery. The victims were ThomasL. Moore (patrol officer), DeonJ. Martin, Gloria Satterfield (Murdaugh housekeeper), and Manuel Santis-Cristiani. Altogether the fraud amount was close to $4.8million resulting in 88 criminal charges. On December9, an additional21 criminal charges were filed connected to an alleged scheme that sought to defraud victims of more than $6million.

On January 21, 2022, the State Grand Jury issued a further 23criminal charges, which included 19breaches of trust with fraudulent intent, and four counts of computer crimes. The indictments allege that he stole more than $2.6million from clients Natarsha Thomas, Arthur Badger, Deon Martin, and the family of Hakeem Pinckney. On March 16, 2022, the State Grand Jury issued a superseding indictment against Murdaugh and Cory Howerton Fleming that includes four new charges against Murdaugh related to an alleged scheme to defraud multiple insurance companies in the course of surreptitiously delivering to Murdaugh a share of the proceeds.

A further round of superseding indictments against Murdaugh were issued in April 2022 involving four charges of conspiring with former banker Russell Lucius Laffitte, and former attorney Cory Howerton Fleming. On August 19, 2022, the State Grand Jury issued a new round of indictments against Murdaugh, Spencer Anwan Roberts, and Jerry K. Rivers. Murdaugh was indicted on nine charges related to the theft of $295,000 from his brother and his old law firm.

The indictments indicate he may have stolen nearly $8.8million from more than a dozen people. The indictments allege crimes back to at least 2011. Murdaugh would secretly negotiate a settlement for his clients, then pay them only enough so they would be content and thankful; he would then steal the rest. His clients were usually minorities who were not well off. They included an injured state trooper, a deaf paraplegic, a widower, an immigrant, and minors. Murdaugh allegedly used money orders given to an unnamed family member to help launder the cash. Although some of the amounts to Fleming and Laffitte overlap as to the alleged amounts for Murdaugh, the State Grand Jury indicted Fleming on 23charges for schemes to defraud victims of over $3.7million. Laffitte had 21 charges against him for schemes to defraud victims of over $1.8million.

Asset custody 

In September 2021, Murdaugh gave broad powers of attorney to his son Buster, including the power to sell and dispose of his assets, which Buster proceeded to do. The Moselle property that was the scene of the murders of Maggie and Paul was rebranded as "Cross Swamp Farm" and listed for sale with an asking price of $3.9million, and the Edisto beach house was placed on the market for $920,000.00 On November 1, a judge ordered the Murdaugh assets to be frozen. Buster and Alex sought to overturn it, saying they had no money to pay for food, medical insurance and utilities.

Murdaugh's assets were placed into a receivership, created because evidence suggested the Murdaugh family was moving and hiding money from potential creditors, including multiple plaintiffs. The Murdaugh family and attorneys have been trying to unwind the receivership in civil court.

Physical custody 

On October 14, 2021, concurrent with his release from the drug rehabilitation facility in Orlando, Murdaugh was taken into custody by the South Carolina Law Enforcement Division (SLED) on two felony counts of Obtaining Property by False Pretenses, related to the Satterfield case.

Murdaugh had been given a $7million bail on the fraud charges, which he could not pay and remained in prison. After being charged with the murder of his wife and son, Murdaugh was denied bail entirely.

Murdaugh has been held in custody at Alvin Glenn Detention Center  in Richland County from October 14, 2021. On March 3, 2023, when he was sentenced to life in prison for the murder of his wife and son, Murdaugh was taken to the Kirkland Correctional Institution, in northwestern Columbia, South Carolina, where he was to be evaluated for about 45 days to determine which maximum-security prison he would be sent to.

Charges for narcotics distribution 

In June 2022, Alex Murdaugh was indicted on two counts by the State Grand Jury related to conspiring with accomplice Curtis Edward Smith (a distant cousin) to purchase and distribute narcotics using a money-laundering scheme involving $2.4million in stolen money. The indictment alleges that Murdaugh and Smith used hundreds of illegal transactions "to facilitate the acquisition and distribution of illegally obtained narcotics" in several counties throughout South Carolina over eight years starting in 2013.

Forge Consulting lawsuit 

On September 12, 2022, Forge Consulting announced it would file a lawsuit against Alex Murdaugh and Bank of America because Forge "suffered serious harm to its business reputation and credibility because of Murdaugh and BoA". Forge alleges Murdaugh "set up a fake bank account using the Forge brand to take millions of dollars from his clients and colleagues" and further blames BoA for not doing basic due diligence to detect the fraud.

Santis-Cristiani lawsuit 

On October 7, 2022, a lawsuit named Murdaugh, Crosby, Barnes, the PMPED firm, Laffitte, and Palmetto State Bank as part of a conspiracy to defraud plaintiff Manuel Santis-Cristiani of Chiapas, Mexico, of accident settlement money he was awarded but never received.

Criminal tax evasion 

On December 16, 2022, Alex Murdaugh was indicted by the State Grand Jury on nine charges of evading nearly $487,000 in state income taxes. The indictment reflects that he stole nearly $7million meant for his law firm's bank accounts and failed to pay taxes on the ill-gotten gains.

Convictions, civil judgements, settlements, and sanctions

Maggie and Paul murders 

On June 7, 2021, Alex called police from his cell phone at 10:06 p.m., saying he had discovered the bodies of 22-year-old son Paul and 52-year-old wife Maggie near the dog kennels at the family's hunting lodge located on a 1,772-acre estate in Islandton, South Carolina. Both had been shot multiple times and with different weapons. Alex initially claimed that at the time of the killings he had been with his mother, who has dementia.

In October 2021, it was revealed that South Carolina Law Enforcement Division had regarded Alex as a person of interest in the homicides since the start of the investigation. In July 2022, Alex Murdaugh was indicted for the murder of his wife, Maggie, and his son, Paul.  Prosecutors suggested a motive where Murdaugh sought a distraction from his financial crimes,  which were beginning to go public, and to garner sympathy. Alex pleaded not guilty. On March 2, 2023, Alex Murdaugh was convicted of both murders. The following day, he was sentenced to life in prison without the possibility of parole.

Disbarment 

On July 12, 2022, the South Carolina Supreme Court issued an official order disbarring Murdaugh from the practice of law in South Carolina. It was based on Murdaugh's "admitted reprehensible misconduct." Murdaugh was allowed to contest the disbarment but did not.

Media portrayals 

The family and the criminal case against Alex Murdaugh has been the subject of several documentaries, docuseries, and podcasts. Some notable examples include:
 Murdaugh Murders podcast (2021; Liz Farrell & Mandy Matney)
 The Murdaugh Dynasty (2022; Campfire Studios / HBO Max)
 The Murdaugh Murders: Deadly Dynasty (2022; Investigation Discovery)
 Murdaugh Murders: A Southern Scandal (2023; Netflix)

Family tree 

The family tree is as follows:

Josiah Putnam Murdaugh II  Annie Marvin Davis
 Randolph Murdaugh Sr. (1887-1940)  Etta Harvey in 1914
 John Glen “Johnny” Murdaugh (1918-1987)
 Randolph "Buster" Murdaugh Jr. (1915-1998)  Gladys Marvin
 Randolph Murdaugh III (1939-2021)  Elizabeth "Libby" Alexander in 1961
 Lynn Murdaugh (1963)  Allen Goettee
 Randolph "Randy" Murdaugh IV (1966)  Christy Michele Miley
 Richard Alexander "Alex" Murdaugh  (1968)  Margaret Kennedy "Maggie" Branstetter
 Richard Alexander "Buster" Murdaugh Jr. (1996)
 Paul Terry Murdaugh (1999-2021)
 John Marvin Murdaugh (1970)   Elizabeth Anne "Liz" Arnett in 2008

References

Further reading

External links 

 SC v. Alex Murdaugh: Murdaugh Family Murder Trial Coverage on Court TV
Crime families
Crime in South Carolina
Hampton County, South Carolina

Politics of South Carolina
Political families of the United States
South Carolina lawyers